Felipe Reyes Cabanás (born 16 March 1980) is a Spanish former professional basketball player. He represented the senior Spain national team. Standing at a height of 2.04 m (6 ft 8 in) tall, and weighing 104 kg (229 lbs.), he plays at the power forward and center positions.

During his pro club career, Reyes won two EuroLeague championships, in 2015 and 2018. He was also an All-EuroLeague First Team selection in the EuroLeague 2014–15 season. With Spain's senior national team, he won the gold medal at the 2006 FIBA World Cup, and gold medals at the 2009 EuroBasket, the 2011 EuroBasket, and the 2015 EuroBasket.

Professional career

Estudiantes Madrid (1998–2004)
Reyes began his professional club career in the Spanish top-tier level ACB League, with Estudiantes Madrid, during the Spanish League 1998–99 season. In that same season, he also played with the club's second level reserve team, Estudiantes B, in the Spanish 2nd-tier level EBA League. He played with Estudiantes through the Spanish League 2003–04 season. With Estudiantes, he also played in the European-wide secondary level EuroCup, and the European-wide premier level EuroLeague.

Real Madrid (2004–2021)
Reyes moved to the Spanish EuroLeague club Real Madrid, before the 2004–05 season. In May 2015, he was named to the 2014–15 season's All-EuroLeague First Team, for his performance during the season; and he was also named the Spanish ACB League Most Valuable Player of the 2014–15 ACB season, marking the second time in his career that he won that award.

During that 2014–15 season, Reyes' club, Real Madrid, won the EuroLeague season's championship, after defeating Olympiacos, by a score of 78–59, in the league's final game. Real Madrid eventually finished the season, by also winning the Spanish ACB League season championship, after a 3–0 series sweep in the Spanish League final series against Barcelona. With that title, Real Madrid had won the Triple Crown for the season.

On 27 June 2015, Reyes signed a two-year contract extension with Real Madrid. He became the Spanish ACB League's all-time career leader in total rebounds, in March 2017, after surpassing the previous record holder, Granger Hall.

In May 2018, Real Madrid won the 2017–18 EuroLeague season's championship, after defeating Fenerbahçe Doğuş in the final game, by a score of 85–80. Over 35 EuroLeague games played that season, Reyes averaged 8.4 points and 4.3 rebounds per game.

On 4 February 2019, Reyes became the ACB League's all-time leader in games played, including both formats of the league (ACB & Primera División). He achieved that after he played in his 779th Spanish League game, against Unicaja Málaga, eclipsing the league's previous record-holder for most games played, Joan Creus's tally. On 15 February 2019, Reyes became the all-time leader in games played in the Spanish King's Cup tournament, as he overtook Juan Carlos Navarro, to achieve that record.

On 24 July 2020 Reyes re-signed with the team.

On 23 June 2021 Reyes announced the end of his successful, prolific and brilliant professional basketball career in which he was the captain of the team.

National team career
Reyes was a member of the junior national teams of Spain. With Spain's junior national teams, he won medals at the following tournaments: the gold medal at the 1998 FIBA Europe Under-18 Championship, the gold medal at the 1999 FIBA Under-19 World Cup, and the bronze medal at the 2000 FIBA Europe Under-20 Championship.

Reyes was a long-time member of the senior Spain men's national basketball team. With Spain's senior national team, he won the following medals: the bronze medal at the 2001 EuroBasket, the silver medal at the 2003 EuroBasket, the gold medal at the 2006 FIBA World Cup, the silver medal at the 2007 EuroBasket, the silver medal at the 2008 Summer Olympics, the gold medal at the 2009 EuroBasket, the gold medal at the 2011 EuroBasket, the silver medal at the 2012 Summer Olympics, the gold medal at the 2015 EuroBasket, and the bronze medal at the 2016 Summer Olympics. With Spain, he also played at the 2002 FIBA World Cup, the 2004 Summer Olympics, the 2005 EuroBasket, the 2010 FIBA World Cup, and the 2014 FIBA World Cup.

Personal life
Reyes' older brother, Alfonso, is also a former professional basketball player. Reyes' nickname is "Espartaco" (English: "Spartacus").

Career statistics

EuroLeague

|-
| style="text-align:left;"|2000–01
| style="text-align:left;"|Estudiantes
| 12 || 7 || 15.8 || .547 ||  || .638 || 4.1 || .6 || .8 || .3 || 7.9 || 8.4
|-
| style="text-align:left;"|2004–05
| style="text-align:left;" rowspan="16"|Real Madrid
| 17 || 14 || 22.8 || .398 ||  || .560 || 7.7 || 1.2 || 1.6 || .4 || 6.8 || 10.9
|-
| style="text-align:left;"|2005–06
| 22 || 22 || 26.5 || .507 ||  || .606 || 7.5 || 1.4 || 1.1 || .3 || 9.8 || 13.5
|-
| style="text-align:left;"|2007–08
| 19 || 10 || 24.4 || .500 ||  || .604 || 7.1 || .9 || 1.3 || .5 || 12.6 || 15.8
|-
| style="text-align:left;"|2008–09
| 19 || 10 || 24.4 || .500 || .500 || .800 || 6.5 || 1.1 || 1.3 || .1 || 13.6 || 15.8
|-
| style="text-align:left;"|2009–10
| 14 || 2 || 17.8 || .432 ||  || .780 || 5.0 || .9 || .8 || .1 || 7.3 || 9.1
|-
| style="text-align:left;"|2010–11
| 21 || 21 || 19.1 || .422 || .200 || .838 || 5.5 || .9 || .4 || .2 || 8.7 || 9.8
|-
| style="text-align:left;"|2011–12
| 16 || 0 || 18.5 || .468 ||  || .793 || 6.3 || .6 || .6 || .2 || 8.4 || 11.3
|-
| style="text-align:left;"|2012–13
| 29 || 0 || 18.1 || .456 || .294 || .706 || 5.1 || .5 || .5 || .3 || 7.6 || 8.9
|-
| style="text-align:left;"|2013–14
| 30 || 0 || 16.5 || .462 || .304 || .855 || 4.8 || .7 || .3 || .2 || 9.1 || 10.3
|-
| style="text-align:left; background:#AFE6BA;"|2014–15†
| 30 || 20 || 19.1 || .502 || .294 || .814 || 5.1 || 1.0 || .5 || .3 || 10.7 || 13.3
|-
| style="text-align:left;"|2015–16
| 26 || 20 || 18.9 || .509 || .414 || .829 || 5.9 || .9 || .5 || .2 || 10.8 || 13.9
|-
| style="text-align:left;"|2016–17
| 30 || 18 || 12.4 || .477 || .333 || .818 || 2.8 || .7 || .3 || .3 || 5.3 || 6.9
|-
| style="text-align:left; background:#AFE6BA;"|2017–18†
| 35 || 7 || 15.5 || .582 || .429 || .793 || 4.3 || .8 || .2 || .2 || 8.4 || 10.9
|-
| style="text-align:left;"|2018–19
| 23 || 1 || 8.9 || .593 ||  || .935 || 2.1 || .3 || .3 || .0 || 4.0 || 5.0
|-
| style="text-align:left;"|2019–20
| 7 || 0 || 8.0 || .429 || .200 || .833 || 1.6 || .4 || .3 || .1 || 3.4 || 2.4
|-
| style="text-align:left;"|2020–21
| 5 || 0 || 4.3 || .250 ||  || .750 || 1.2 || .2 || .2 || .2 || 1.4 || 0.8
|- class="sortbottom"
| style="text-align:center;" colspan="2"|Career
| 357 || 152 || 17.8 || .488 || .320 || .749 || 5.0 || .8 || .6 || .2 || 8.5 || 10.6

Awards and accomplishments

Pro career
 6× Spanish Cup winner (2000, 2012, 2014–2017)
 7× Spanish League champion (2005, 2007, 2013, 2015, 2016, 2018, 2019)
 EuroCup champion (2007)
 4× All-Spanish League Team (2007–2009, 2015)
 2× Spanish League Finals MVP (2007, 2013)
 2× Spanish League MVP (2009, 2015)
 5× Spanish Supercup winner (2012–2014), (2018, 2019)
 All-EuroLeague First Team (2015)
 2× EuroLeague champion (2015, 2018)
 FIBA Intercontinental Cup champion (2015)
 Spanish League all-time leader in games played
 Spanish League all-time leader in total rebounds

Spanish junior national team
 FIBA U18 European Championship: 
 FIBA Under-19 Basketball World Cup: 
 FIBA U20 European Championship:

Spanish senior national team
 EuroBasket 2001: 
 EuroBasket 2003: 
 2006 FIBA World Championship: 
 EuroBasket 2007: 
 2008 Summer Olympic Games: 
 EuroBasket 2009: 
 EuroBasket 2011: 
 2012 Summer Olympic Games: 
 EuroBasket 2015: 
 2016 Summer Olympic Games:

References

External links
Felipe Reyes at acb.com 
Felipe Reyes at eurobasket.com
Felipe Reyes at euroleague.net
Felipe Reyes at draftexpress.com

Felipe Reyes at fibaeurope.com
Felipe Reyes at realgm.com
Felipe Reyes at twitter.com 

1980 births
Living people
2002 FIBA World Championship players
2006 FIBA World Championship players
2010 FIBA World Championship players
2014 FIBA Basketball World Cup players
Basketball players at the 2004 Summer Olympics
Basketball players at the 2008 Summer Olympics
Basketball players at the 2012 Summer Olympics
Basketball players at the 2016 Summer Olympics
CB Estudiantes players
Centers (basketball)
FIBA World Championship-winning players
Liga ACB players
Medalists at the 2008 Summer Olympics
Medalists at the 2012 Summer Olympics
Medalists at the 2016 Summer Olympics
Olympic basketball players of Spain
Olympic bronze medalists for Spain
Olympic medalists in basketball
Olympic silver medalists for Spain
Power forwards (basketball)
Real Madrid Baloncesto players
Spanish men's basketball players
Sportspeople from Córdoba, Spain